William "Bill"/"Billy" Brookes (birth unknown – death unknown), also known by the nickname of "Tubby", was a professional rugby league footballer who played in the 1900s. He played at representative level for England, and at club level for Outwood Church ARLFC, Kippax ARLFC, and Hunslet, as a forward (prior to the specialist positions of), during the era of contested scrums.

Playing career

International honours
Bill Brookes won caps for England while at Hunslet in 1905 against Other Nationalities, and in 1906 against Other Nationalities.

Challenge Cup Final appearances
Bill Brookes played as a forward, i.e. number 9, in Hunslet's 14-0 victory over Hull F.C. in the 1907–08 Challenge Cup Final during the 1907–08 season at Fartown Ground, Huddersfield on Saturday 25 April 1908, in front of a crowd of 18,000.

County Cup Final appearances
Bill Brookes played as a forward, i.e. number 8, in Hunslet's 13-3 victory over Halifax in the 1905–06 Yorkshire County Cup Final during the 1905–06 season at Park Avenue, Bradford on Saturday 2 December 1905, and played as a forward, i.e. number 11, in the 17-0 victory over Halifax in the 1907–08 Yorkshire County Cup Final during the 1907–08 season at Headingley Rugby Stadium, Leeds on Saturday 21 December 1907.

All Four Cups, and "The Terrible Six"
Bill Brookes was a member of Hunslet's 1907–08 season All Four Cups winning team, the Forwards were known as "The Terrible Six" they were; Tom Walsh, Harry Wilson, Jack Randall, Bill "Tubby" Brookes, Bill Jukes and John Willie Higson.

References

External links

England national rugby league team players
English rugby league players
Hunslet F.C. (1883) players
Place of birth missing
Place of death missing
Rugby league forwards
Year of birth missing
Year of death missing